Trần Văn Kiên (born 13 May 1996) is a Vietnamese footballer who plays as a right-back for V-League club Hà Nội.

Honours
Sài Gòn
V.League 2: 2015
Hà Nội
V.League 1: 2016, 2018, 2019, 2022; Runner-up: 2020
Vietnamese National Cup: 2019, 2020, 2022; Runner-up: 2016 
Vietnamese Super Cup: 2019, 2020, 2021; Runner-up: 2016, 2017
Vietnam
King's Cup: Runner-up 2019

References 

1996 births
Living people
Vietnamese footballers
Association football fullbacks
V.League 1 players
Hanoi FC players
People from Nghệ An province
Vietnam international footballers
Competitors at the 2017 Southeast Asian Games
Southeast Asian Games competitors for Vietnam